Marius Hiller, also known as Eduardo Hiller (5 August 1892 – 17 October 1964), was a footballer who played international football for both Germany and Argentina. He was the nephew of fellow German international Arthur Hiller.

In Germany he played for 1. FC Pforzheim and three times for the German national side, where he is until today (2022) the youngest ever scorer and second youngest player ever.

References

1892 births
1964 deaths
German footballers
Germany international footballers
Argentine footballers
Argentina international footballers
Argentine people of German descent
Dual internationalists (football)
Expatriate footballers in Argentina
German emigrants to Argentina
Association football midfielders
Sportspeople from Pforzheim
Footballers from Baden-Württemberg